George Russell Manners (25 January 1938 – August 2021) was a male weightlifter who competed for England.

Weightlifting career
Manners represented Great Britain at the 1964 Summer Olympics finishing in 15th place in the light-heavyweight category. He represented England and finished fifth in the -60 kg combined category at the 1958 British Empire and Commonwealth Games in Cardiff, Wales. He won two silver medals at the 1962 British Empire and Commonwealth Games and the 1966 British Empire and Commonwealth Games respectively.

Personal life
He migrated to England in 1957 and was a plumber by trade. He died in August 2021 at the age of 83.

References

External links

1938 births
2021 deaths
Black British sportspeople
English male weightlifters
Commonwealth Games medallists in weightlifting
Commonwealth Games silver medallists for England
Weightlifters at the 1958 British Empire and Commonwealth Games
Weightlifters at the 1964 Summer Olympics
Olympic weightlifters of Great Britain
English people of Saint Vincent and the Grenadines descent
Medallists at the 1962 British Empire and Commonwealth Games
Medallists at the 1966 British Empire and Commonwealth Games
Medallists at the 1970 British Commonwealth Games